Ion Jalea (19 May 1887 – 7 November 1983) was a Romanian sculptor, medallist, titular member of the Romanian Academy.

Biography

Artistic studies 

Jalea was born on 19 May 1887 in the little town of Casimcea, Tulcea County. His family moved in 1893 to Ciocârlia de Jos village, from where he went on to the Mircea cel Bătrân High School in Constanța.  He then studied at the School of Arts and Crafts (in Romanian, Școala de Arte și Meserii) and from 1909 at the National University of Arts in Bucharest, where he was the pupil of the renowned Romanian sculptors Frederic Storck and Dimitrie Paciurea. His first personal exhibit occurred in May 1915. 

Starting in 1916, his artistic education was pursued in Paris at the Académie Julian. At the time, he worked alongside Henri Coandă as apprentice in sculpture in Auguste Rodin's atelier, after which he continued in Antoine Bourdelle's studio.

World War I 
After Romania entered World War I in August 1916 on the side of the Alies, Jalea returned home. In 1917, he volunteered into the Romanian Army, and fought in a series of battles on the Moldavian front, at Corbu, Măxineni, and Nămoloasa. On August 17, 1917, he was severely wounded; after being treated at Galați and then Iași, doctors managed to save his left foot, but his left arm had to be amputated next to the shoulder.  For his valor, he was decorated with the Romanian Order of the Crown, Knight rank, and the French Croix de Guerre, which was conferred to him by general Henri Mathias Berthelot.

Career
After recuperating, despite being an amputee, Jalea continued to dedicate his life to sculpture, as he did before. He became a well-known sculptor by working with his right arm only, and his greatest achievements were after he lost his arm. 

Jalea won a prize at the 1929 Barcelona International Exposition, received one of the Grand Prizes at the Paris Exhibition of 1937 for the monument Romania and its provinces, and participated in the 1939 New York World's Fair. In 1932, he became professor at the Bucharest National University of Arts, and in 1942 director at the Ministry of Arts.

Sculptures 

During his long artistic career, Jalea authored numerous monuments, statues, busts, reliefs, and allegorical compositions, aiming to glorify significant facts or personalities. His sculpture technique blends the pictorial quality of the shaped surface — the influence of Paciurea and Rodin — with a rigorous spatial formation, complemented by the harmony and balance of shapes, so specific to Bourdelle.

 Fall of Angels and Fall of Lucifer, 1915.
 Monument of the CFR heroes, done in 1923 together with Cornel Medrea and displayed at Gara de Nord in Bucharest.
 Hercules and the Centaur, 1925, displayed in Herăstrău Park.
 Resting Archer, 1926, at the Ion Jalea Museum in Constanța.
 Bas-reliefs from the Mausoleum of Mărășești, done in 1930 together with Medrea.
 Statue of Spiru Haret, 1935, in University Square, Bucharest.
 Statue of Dumitru Brezulescu, 1936, at Novaci; destroyed in 1948.
 Several sculptures from the facades of Arcul de Triumf, 1936.
 Statue of Queen Elisabeth (Carmen Sylva), 1937, at Constanța.
 Bust of Mihai Eminescu, 1943, in Cișmigiu Gardens.
 Bust of Octavian Goga, 1943, in Cișmigiu Gardens; destroyed after 1944 and replaced by a bust of Ion Creangă.
 Statue of George Enescu, 1971, in front of the Romanian National Opera, Bucharest.
 Equestrian statue of Mircea I of Wallachia, 1972, at Tulcea. 
 Bust of Theodor Rogalski, at Romanian Radio Broadcasting Company.
 Statues Hammer Thrower and  Mother and Schoolchild, 1977, at Suceava.
 Equestrian statue of Decebalus, 1978, at Deva.
 Dragoș and the Bison monument, 1978, at Câmpulung Moldovenesc.

Coin design 

In 1935, he designed the 250 lei coin, which features the Coat of arms of the Kingdom of Romania and the Effigy of King Carol II.

Awards and distinctions 
In 1941, Jalea received the Romanian National Prize for sculpture. In 1948, he was elected corresponding member of the Romanian Academy, and in 1955, he was promoted to titular member of the Academy. In 1956, he became President of the Union of Romanian Plastic Artists. In 1966, he was awarded the Order of Cultural Merit, first class, for the sculpture Hercules and the Centaur.  In 1962, he was awarded the Order of the Star of the Romanian People's Republic, first class, while in 1971, he was awarded the title of Hero of Socialist Labour and the "Hammer and Sickle" medal.

Legacy 
The Ion Jalea Museum of Sculpture is located in Constanța, close to the Casino.  The building, designed by the architect  after World War I, was turned in a museum in 1968, when Jalea donated to the city part of his private art collection. After his death, the collection was completed with sculptures donated by his family, arriving at a total of 227 works of art.

References

External links 

 
 

1887 births
1983 deaths
People from Tulcea County
Bucharest National University of Arts alumni
Romanian military personnel of World War I
Romanian amputees
Knights of the Order of the Crown (Romania)
Recipients of the Croix de Guerre 1914–1918 (France)
20th-century Romanian sculptors
20th-century medallists
Titular members of the Romanian Academy
Recipients of the Order of the Star of the Romanian Socialist Republic
Heroes of Socialist Labour
Academic staff of the Bucharest National University of Arts
Mircea cel Bătrân National College (Constanța) alumni